Navi Mumbai International Airport, officially D. B. Patil International Airport, is an international airport being constructed in Navi Mumbai, Maharashtra, India. It will serve in parallel as an alternative with Mumbai's existing Chhatrapati Shivaji Maharaj International Airport (CSMIA), becoming the second airport of the Mumbai Metropolitan Region.

The airport is a greenfield international airport being built by City and Industrial Development Corporation (CIDCO). It will be built in three phases, out of which the first phase of the airport will be able to handle 25 million passengers per annum. It will be expanded to its final capacity of third phase to handle more than 90 million passengers per annum. The Texas-based Jacobs Engineering Group, has charted the final masterplan for the airport, while the passenger terminals and the Air Traffic Control (ATC) tower have been designed by London-based Zaha Hadid Architects.

The ₹16,700 crore (US$2.1 billion) project is being executed by Navi Mumbai International Airport Limited (NMIAL), a special-purpose vehicle formed by the Adani Airports Holdings Limited and CIDCO, which will hold 74 percent and 26 percent equity shares of NMIAL respectively. CIDCO will build the project through a public–private partnership (PPP) model on a Design, Build, Finance, Operate, and Transfer (DBFOT) basis. The airport covers an area of 1,160 hectares (4.5 sq.mi).

The airport's construction was started in August 2021, and is expected to be fully operational by 2025.

It will be connected with Navi Mumbai Metro's Line 1 and with the proposed Mumbai Metro's Line 8 (Gold Line). In the proposed Mumbai-Hyderabad High-Speed Rail (HSR) corridor from Mumbai to Hyderabad, the airport will be the starting point of the corridor, by having a terminal station.

History 
The project was first conceived in November 1997. The Ministry of Civil Aviation (MoCA) constituted a committee to examine various sites for an extension to Chhatrapati Shivaji International Airport. The committee recommended a site at Mandwa–Rewas in June 2000, because the proposed airport was to have a single runway. That September, CIDCO revised the original proposal to provide for a pair of parallel runways and submitted its feasibility report to the MoCA. Airports Authority of India (AAI)'s sub-committee found the Navi Mumbai site technically and operationally feasible, and suggested that CIDCO carry out a detailed Techno-Economic Feasibility Study (TEFS) of the project. The TEFS was submitted to the State Government in September 2001, following which the International Civil Aviation Organization (ICAO) conducted a simulation study that confirmed that simultaneous operation of two airports was possible with appropriate procedures in place. In February 2007, CIDCO submitted a Project Feasibility and Business Plan Report to the MoCA, and the project received in-principle approval from the Union Cabinet in July 2007.

In July 2008, the Government of Maharashtra granted approval for development of the project on a Public-Private Partnership (PPP) basis and appointed CIDCO as the nodal agency for its implementation. The project received defence clearance by the Ministry of Defence (MoD) by the end of 2010. The site had several environmental problems concerning mangroves and rain/storm water drains in Panvel. There is an NGO fighting government agencies regarding Panvel. The Ministry of Environment, Forest and Climate Change (MoEFCC) gave its clearance for the airport on 14 May 2008. MoEFCC finally cleared the project on 23 November 2010.

CIDCO invited global tenders for requests for qualification (RFQ) on 5 February 2014. The agency received nine bids and shortlisted four bidders, including GMR Group, the GVK-led MIAL, Hiranandani Group, Zurich Airport, and Mia Infrastructure with Tata Realty and Infrastructure. CIDCO submitted their RFQs to the Project Management Committee (PMC) for scrutiny. The PMC then submitted its report to the Chief Minister of Maharashtra, who must approve the project, before it received final approval from the MoCA. GVK was the only bidder in the final two rounds of bidding, causing CIDCO to extend the deadline for the tender twice. Subsequently, the GMR Group submitted a bid. On 13 February 2017, GVK-led MIAL was announced as the winning bidder. GVK offered CIDCO a 12.6% share in revenue, as compared to the 10.44% offered by the GMR Group.

The MoEFCC provided clearance to carry out pre-development work for the airport in April 2017. Work could not begin until 14 June 2017, however, due to opposition from local villagers. Pre-development work includes flattening the Ulwe Hill, reclaiming marsh land, diverting the Ulwe River outside the airport boundary and widening the channel to 60 metres, and shifting power transmission lines. It is expected to take two years to complete. CIDCO will raise the level of the land by 5.5 metres. Work was stalled again from 12 October 2017 due to protests from local villagers, but resumed on 28 October 2017 after CIDCO reached an agreement with the protestors.

Prime Minister Narendra Modi unveiled the foundation plaque at the ground breaking ceremony for the airport in Mumbai on 18 February 2018. Navi Mumbai International Airport (P) Limited (NMIAL), appointed London-based Zaha Hadid Architects (ZHA) in March 2018 to design the airport's Terminal 1 and the ATC tower. Zaha Hadid Architects was selected on completion of a 12-week fast track design competition amongst the international architecture firms that were shortlisted by GVK. CIDCO floated a tender to select the engineering, procurement, and construction contractor for the project in August 2018.

CIDCO appointed Pune-based Central Water and Power Research Station (CWPRS) in 2011, to study the hydrological impact of the airport on the surrounding waterbodies. The CWPRS conducted hydrological and Mathematical Model studies of the Ulwe River catchment area and had recommended cutting a channel to divert the Ulwe River into the Moha Creek. CIDCO completed pre-development work on the Ulwe River diversion by June 2019.

In September 2019, GVK awarded a contract for construction of the airport to Larsen and Toubro (L&T).

The airport was sold to the Adani Group in 2021, and Adani Group started the construction in August 2021. As of today, the ongoing developmental work includes ground work, i.e., flattening of the Ulwe Hill, which falls in the trajectory of the Southern Runway and Terminal 1. Due to several hurdles and issues, such as due to issues in land acquisition, protests from local villagers for several times, impact of COVID-19, rehabilitation issues, issues from Central and State Government and concerns raised by environmental activists, the project moved on with a slow pace since 2020. As of April 2022, CIDCO declared that those hurdles and issues have been finally resolved, and the construction will pick up fast pace within a few weeks. It was expected that the first phase of the airport will be completed by July 2024. However, according to a recent announcement, the first and second phases have been merged and construction will complete in December 2024 with the airport opening in 2025.

Facilities

Structure

Runways
The airport will have two runways:
 Runway 08L/26R: 
 Runway 08R/26L:

Terminals 1, 2, and 3
Zaha Hadid has designed the Navi Mumbai International Airport. It will have three state-of-the-art interconnected terminal buildings. The buildings will feature food courts, lounges, travellators, and other facilities for passengers. In the final phase, the total capacity of the airport will be 90 million passengers. The buildings will be shaped like a lotus to provide an aesthetic theme. The airport will also have a low-cost carrier terminal capable of handling two million passengers per annum in the first phase.

Cargo terminal

Other facilities
The airport will have a  fuel farm and three aircraft hangars. There is a planned dedicated MRO facility.

Navi Mumbai International Airport plans

CIDCO's RFQ in 2014 estimated total project cost for the development of phase 1 and 2 of NMIA to be .

The project required the relocation of 2,786 households located across 10 villages—Chinchpada, Kopar, Kolhi, Ulwe, Varcha (Upper) Owle, Waghivalivada, Vaghivali, Ganeshpuri, Targhar, and Kombadbhuje. Most of the residents affected by the project are fishermen, farmers, or work odd jobs. CIDCO extended the deadline for all residents to vacate their houses to 30 November 2018, and again to 15 January 2019. Another hurdle to construct the airport was the flattening and destruction of the Ulwe Hill, which falls under the trajectory of the southern parallel runway.

See also
 Juhu Aerodrome
 Jawaharlal Nehru Port
 Mumbai Trans Harbour Link
 Vikhroli-Koparkhairane Link Road
 Jogeshwari-Vikhroli Link Road
 Sion Panvel Expressway
 Bandra-Worli Sea Link
 List of airports in India

References

External links
 CIDCO and Navi Mumbai International Airport
 2nd Airport for Navi Mumbai and how not to build it by Dorab Sopariwala
 Navi Mumbai airport: runway construction cleared

Airports in Maharashtra
International airports in India
Proposed airports in Maharashtra
Buildings and structures in Navi Mumbai
Transport in Panvel
2020 in India